Malaysia Day is a public holiday held on 16 September every year to commemorate the establishment of the Malaysian federation on that date in 1963. This event saw Malaya, North Borneo (which was renamed Sabah), Sarawak, and Singapore unite into a single state. Singapore, however, was expelled from the federation less than two years later, on 9 August 1965.

History
The planned date for the formation of the new federation was 1 June 1963, but the event was postponed to 31 August 1963, to coincide with the sixth anniversary of Hari Merdeka. Several issues relating to the objections of neighbouring Indonesia and the Philippines to the formation of Malaysia delayed the declaration to 16 September of the same year. The postponement also allowed the United Nations team time to conduct a fact-finding mission in North Borneo and Sarawak regarding the two states participation in a new federation. 

No referendum regarding federation was ever conducted in North Borneo or Sarawak. Singapore held a referendum on 1 September 1962, with all three options endorsing integration into Malaysia.

The formation of Malaysia was done under the basis of the Malaysia Agreement, signed in 1963 by the United Kingdom, the Federation of Malaya, Sarawak, North Borneo, and Singapore. This Agreement set out the terms and conditions for the component States to be federated under a new constitution. This Agreement included in its annexes the "Malaysia Bill" (Annex A), and the constitutions of Sabah (Annex B), Sarawak (Annex C), and Singapore (Annex D).

Prior to the formation of Malaysia, Sarawak gained self-governance on 22 July 1963. 

The "Malaysia Bill" was introduced in the Malayan Parliament on 9 July 1963, and received consent from Tuanku Syed Putra, the Yang di-Pertuan Agong on 29 August 1963.

North Borneo (now Sabah) only became self-governing from 31 August 1963, which coincided with the sixth anniversary of Malayan independence from the British Empire and was also the original intended date of the Malaysia Agreement.

The first two commemoration anniversaries were celebrated unofficially both respectively in 1973, which marks a decade (10th anniversary) of the federation's existence and also 15 years later in 1988, which marks the silver jubilee (25th anniversary) of independence for Sabah and Sarawak states through their accession into the federation as member states.

Prior to 2010, Malaysia Day was observed as a state public holiday only in Sabah and Sarawak (with subsequent unofficial commemoration anniversaries in 1993 – pearl jubilee or 30th anniversary, 1998 – coral jubilee or 35th anniversary, 2003 – ruby jubilee or 40th anniversary and the last being in 2008 – sapphire jubilee or 45th anniversary), but an unofficial patriotic day of observance marked nationally (it marks the end of the annual month-long August–September Independence Month observance) and only the anniversary of the nation's formation. 

Prime Minister Najib Razak made the decision after a question-and-answer session at Parliament on 19 October 2009, giving Malaysians two celebrations related to the country's independence and sovereignty. Beginning the year 2010, Malaysia Day became a nationwide public holiday. 

The inaugural celebrations only began in 2011, in which Hari Merdeka was celebrated albeit simultaneously for that year only (as since it was delayed by a time limit of 2 weeks' late), since that year's annually observed date of 31 August coincided or clashed with that year's Eid-ul-Fitr celebrations.

The celebrations in 2013 was the official golden jubilee observance which symbolically commemorates the sacrifices of the nation's security officers, in which it became the main focus and theme in response to the consequences brought in by the 2013 Lahad Datu stand-off, in which that year's celebrations were observed as a mark of tribute and respect to the casualties of the incursion (both personnel and civilians alike) in addition to reaching a milestone of 50 years since the establishment of the country on 16 September 1963.

In conjunction with the 55th anniversary celebrations in 2018 under the new, but short-lived Pakatan Harapan (PH) government, Prime Minister Mahathir Mohamad promised to restore a more autonomous status to Sabah and Sarawak in accordance with the original Malaysia Agreement, changing "their status from merely a state to an equal partner of the Malayan states." 

Two years later in 2020 (just a decade into the celebration's gazetting as an additional public holiday), Prime Minister Muhyiddin Yassin of the Perikatan Nasional-Gabungan Parti Sarawak-Barisan Nasional-United Sabah Party current-ruling cum returning coalition unity government made a similar pledge.

Other observations
16 September is also Malaysian Armed Forces Day, in which this was the very same day it was established, 30 years prior to the Formation of Malaysia way back during the British colonial era in the year 1933.

In popular culture
Malaysia Forever was a song composed by Bobby Gimby to celebrate the Formation of Malaysia on 16 September 1963. Bobby Gimby received the nickname "The Pied Piper of Canada" after the Prime Minister nicked Gimby "the Pied Piper from Canada". The song was recorded in Kuala Lumpur and Singapore. It is a folk song with a length of 2 minutes sung by the Choir of the Marymount Vocational School (Singapore). On the days before the merger, it was taught to school children and became an instant hit when it was broadcast over the air-waves throughout Malaysia.

See also
 Independence Day (Malaysia)
 Sarawak Independence Day
 North Borneo Self-government Day
 20-point agreement (Sabah)
 18-point agreement (Sarawak)
 History of Malaysia
 Singapore in Malaysia
 Malaysia Forever

References

External links
 
 

Formation of Malaysia
National days
Malaysian Independence
Public holidays in Malaysia
September observances